California's 1st State Assembly district is one of 80 California State Assembly districts. It is currently represented by Republican Megan Dahle of Bieber.

District profile 
The district stretches along the eastern edge of the state from the Oregon border to Lake Tahoe, wrapping around the Sacramento Valley along the northern Sierra Nevada. The district is primarily rural and heavily Republican.

Butte County – 9.0%
 Magalia

All of Lassen County
 Susanville

All of Modoc County
 Alturas

All of Nevada County
 Grass Valley
 Nevada City
 Truckee

Placer County – 16.7%
 Colfax
 Kings Beach
 North Auburn

All of Plumas County
 Portola
 Quincy

All of Shasta County
 Anderson
 Redding
 Shasta Lake

All of Sierra County
 Downieville
 Loyalton

All of Siskiyou County
 Dorris
 Dunsmuir
 Etna
 Fort Jones
 Montague
 Mount Shasta
 Tulelake
 Weed
 Yreka

Election results from statewide races

List of assembly members 
Due to redistricting, the 1st district has been moved around different parts of the state. The current iteration resulted from the 2011 redistricting by the California Citizens Redistricting Commission.

Election results 1992 - present

2020

2019 (special)

2018

2016

2014

2012

2010

2008

2006

2004

2002

2000

1998

1996

1994

1992

See also 
 California State Assembly
 California State Assembly districts
 Districts in California

References

External links 
 District map from the California Citizens Redistricting Commission

01
Government of Butte County, California
Government of Lassen County, California
Government of Modoc County, California
Government of Nevada County, California
Government of Placer County, California
Government of Plumas County, California
Government of Shasta County, California
Government of Sierra County, California
Government of Siskiyou County, California
Sierra Nevada (United States)
Shasta Cascade
Alturas, California
Colfax, California
Downieville, California
Grass Valley, California
Mount Shasta
Mount Shasta, California (city)
Nevada City, California
Oroville, California
Quincy, California
Red Bluff, California
Redding, California
Truckee, California
Yreka, California